"Supermarket Flowers" is a song by English singer-songwriter Ed Sheeran. It was included on his third studio album ÷ (2017), appearing as the final track on the standard edition of the album. After the album's release it charted at number 8 on the UK Singles Chart. It was released as a promotional single following Sheeran's performance at the 2018 Brit Awards.

Background
The song is the 12th and final track on the standard version of  Ed Sheeran's third studio album ÷ (Divide).

In an interview with MTV, Sheeran revealed that the song is about his late mother.  He said "She was in a hospital near my house where I was making the album so I saw her quite a lot while making the album and she passed away while I was in the studio. So that's my first reaction for anything that happens to me, good or bad, pick up a guitar."  He also said that the song is supposed to "really make you cry". Sheeran had not intended to put the song in the album 'Divide' as it was simply a personal tribute to his mother. His father first suggested that he should play the song at her funeral, which he did, and his grandfather then urged that it should be included in the album after hearing it at the funeral. Sheeran said: "My grandfather just turned to me [at the funeral], he was like you have to put that out, that has to go on the record. It's such a good memory, that's why it’s ended up on there."

Charts

Weekly charts

Year-end charts

Certifications

References

2016 songs
2010s ballads
Ed Sheeran songs
Songs written by Ed Sheeran
Songs written by Johnny McDaid
Songs written by Benny Blanco
Song recordings produced by Benny Blanco
Commemoration songs